"Slow Ride" is a song by the English rock band Foghat. It was the lead single from their fifth studio album, Fool for the City (1975), released on Bearsville Records. In 2009, it was named the 45th "Best Hard Rock" song of all time by VH1.
 
There are five versions of the song. The original LP version from Fool for the City lasts 8 minutes and 14 seconds. The single version, found in several compilations, was truncated to 3:56 with a fade-out ending. The 1977 live version is 8:21, the King Biscuit Flower Hour Foghat version is 10:37 and the 2007 live version is 9:44.

According to drummer Roger Earl, the song was created during a jam session with then new bassist Nick Jameson.

The song is the band's highest charting Billboard single and remains a staple of classic rock. The song was featured in the movies Dazed and Confused, The SpongeBob Movie: Sponge on the Run, Top Gun: Maverick, Bad Moms, Jackass Presents: Bad Grandpa and Wild Hogs.

Chart history

Weekly charts

Year-end charts

References

External links 

1975 songs
1975 singles
Bearsville Records singles
Foghat songs
Songs written for animated films